The 18th Attack Squadron is a squadron of the United States Air Force. It is assigned to the 432d Operations Group, and has been stationed at Creech Air Force Base, Nevada since 2009. The squadron conducts strike, intelligence, surveillance and reconnaissance missions, operating the General Atomics MQ-1 Predator unmanned aerial vehicle.

The squadron was first activated as a fighter unit, the 381st Fighter Squadron, in 1943.  After deploying to the European Theater of Operations and engaging in combat for six months, the squadron was converted, along with the other squadrons of the 363d Fighter Group, to an reconnaissance unit as the 161st Tactical Reconnaissance Squadron.  It continued in combat until V-E Day, earning a Belgian Fourragère after being twice cited in the Order of the Day of the Belgian Army.  The squadron returned to the United States in the fall of 1945 and was inactivated.

The squadron was reactivated in 1946 and performed both reconnaissance and training, primarily from Shaw Air Force Base, South Carolina until 1959.  It was redesignated the 18th Tactical Reconnaissance Squadron in 1950 because its number, 161, fell in a block reserved for Air National Guard units.  It moved to Europe, where it performed reconnaissance for United States Air Forces Europe until 1970, when it returned to Shaw.  The squadron was inactivated there in 1979.

History

World War II

Activated as part of IV Fighter Command in early 1943 with Bell P-39 Airacobras, the squadron was an air defense unit for the San Francisco area as well as a Replacement Training Unit until the end of 1943. It then retrained on North American P-51 Mustangs and deployed to the European Theater of Operations, where it was assigned to IX Fighter Command in the United Kingdom. It operated both as a tactical fighter squadron, providing air support to Allied ground forces in France as well as an air defense squadron, attacking enemy aircraft over Europe.

In August 1944, the squadron was redesignated the 161st Tactical Reconnaissance Squadron carrying out photo-reconnaissance missions. The unit was inactivated in November 1945.

Cold War tactical reconnaissance
Reactivated in 1945 at Brooks Field, Texas under the 363d Reconnaissance Group, it trained with the Lockheed RF-80A Shooting Star. The 18th moved to Langley Field in 1947 when Brooks was transferred to Strategic Air Command. The squadron was reassigned directly to the Fourteenth Air Force in 1949 when the 363d was inactivated and moved to Shaw Air Force Base, South Carolina.

The unit was reassigned to the 363d when the group was reactivated at Shaw on 2 April 1951. It became a training squadron with a mission to provide photographic intelligence training to support both air and ground operations by American or Allied ground forces.  Upgraded to the Republic RF-84F Thunderflash in 1954, it continued training operations until 1957 when it re-equipped with the McDonnell RF-101C Voodoo.

The squadron was reassigned to the 66th Tactical Reconnaissance Wing and deployed to NATO in 1959. It operated from France until 1966, moving to RAF Upper Heyford, England. It remained in the UK until 1970, when it returned to Shaw AFB and was assigned to the 363d Tactical Reconnaissance Wing. It was re-equipped with the McDonnell RF-4C Phantom II at Shaw and performed training for new photo-reconnaissance pilots until 1979 when it was inactivated.

Unmanned Aerial Vehicle reconnaissance
The squadron was reactivated at Beale Air Force Base, California as the 18th Reconnaissance Squadron, a Northrop Grumman RQ-4 Global Hawk strategic reconnaissance unmanned aerial vehicle squadron between 2006 and 2007. It was reactivated at Creech Air Force Base, Nevada in 2009 as a General Atomics MQ-1 Predator squadron.  In May 2016, the squadron was renamed the 18th Attack Squadron.

Lineage
 Constituted as the 381st Fighter Squadron (Single Engine) on 11 February 1943
 Activated on 1 March 1943
 Redesignated 381st Fighter Squadron, Single Engine on 20 August 1943
 Redesignated 161st Tactical Reconnaissance Squadron on 25 August 1944
 Inactivated on 9 November 1945
 Redesignated 161st Reconnaissance Squadron, Photo (Jet Propelled) on 9 July 1946
 Activated on 31 August 1946
 Redesignated 161st Tactical Reconnaissance Squadron, Photo-Jet on 28 August 1948
 Redesignated 18th Tactical Reconnaissance Squadron, Photo-Jet on 10 October 1950
 Redesignated 18th Tactical Reconnaissance Squadron on 1 October 1966
 Inactivated on 30 September 1979
 Redesignated 18th Reconnaissance Squadron on 14 March 2006
 Activated on 3 April 2006
 Inactivated on 24 August 2007
 Activated on 11 December 2009
 Redesignated 18th Attack Squadron on 15 May 2016

Assignments
 363d Fighter Group (later 363d Tactical Reconnaissance Group), 1 March 1943 (attached to 10th Photographic Group, 23 December 1944 – 3 January 1945)
 67th Reconnaissance Group, 3 July–9 November 1945
 363d Reconnaissance Group (later 363d Tactical Reconnaissance Group), 31 August 1946 (attached to 20th Fighter Wing after 20 September 1949)
 Fourteenth Air Force, 23 September 1949 (attached to 20th Fighter Wing)
 363d Tactical Reconnaissance Group, 2 April 1951
 432d Tactical Reconnaissance Wing, 8 February 1958
 66th Tactical Reconnaissance Wing, 1 June 1959
 363d Tactical Reconnaissance Wing, 30 January 1970 – 30 September 1979
 9th Operations Group, 3 April 2006 – 24 August 2007
 432d Operations Group, 11 December 2009 – present

Stations
 Hamilton Field, California, 1 March 1943
 Santa Rosa Army Air Field, California, 23 August 1943
 Sacramento Municipal Airport, California, 8 October – 2 December 1943
 RAF Keevil (AAF-471), England, 23 December 1943
 RAF Rivenhall (AAF-168), England, c. 3 February 1944
 RAF Staplehurst (AAF-413), England, 14 April 1944
 Maupertu Airfield (A-15), France, c. 5 July 1944
 Azeville Airfield (A-7), France, c. 22 August 1944
 Montreuil Airfield (A-38), France, 9 September 1944
 Sandweiler Airfield (A-97), Luxembourg, 11 October 1944
 Le Culot Airfield (A-89), Belgium, 29 October 1944
 Operated from Conflans Airfield (A-94), France, 24 December 1944 – 6 February 1945
 Venlo Airfield (Y-55), Netherlands, 11 March 1945
 Gutersloh Airfield (R-85), Germany, 16 April 1945
 Brunswick/Waggum Airfield (R-37), Germany, 26 April 1945
 AAF Station Wiesbaden (Y-80), Germany, 20 May 1945
 Reims/Champagne Airfield (A-62), France, c, 3 Jul – c. 4 September 1945
 Drew Field, Florida 16 September – 9 November 1945
 Brooks Field, Texas, 31 August 1946
 Langley Field (later Langley Air Force Base), Virginia, 1 November 1946
 Shaw Air Force Base, South Carolina, 23 September 1949 – 25 May 1959
 Laon-Couvron Air Base, France, 1 June 1959
 RAF Upper Heyford, England, 1 September 1966
 Shaw Air Force Base, South Carolina, 30 January 1970 – 30 September 1979
 Beale Air Force Base, California, 3 April 2006 – 24 August 2007
 Creech Air Force Base, Nevada, 11 December 2009 – present

Aircraft

 Bell P-39 Airacobra (1943)
 North American P-51 Mustang (1944–1945)
 North American F-6 Mustang (1944–1945, 1946–1947)
 Lockheed FP-80 (later RF-80) Shooting Star (1946–1955)
 Lockheed T-33 T-Bird (1950–1954)
 Republic RF-84F Thunderflash (1954–1957)
 McDonnell RF-101 Voodoo (1957–1970)
 McDonnell RF-4 Phantom II (1970–1979)
 Northrop Grumman RQ-4 Global Hawk (2006–2007)
 General Aromics MQ-1 Predator (2009 – present)

References

Notes
 Explanatory notes

 Citations

Bibliography

External links

Military units and formations in Nevada
018